Aryan Niraj Lamba (born 28 October 2002) is an Indian professional footballer who plays as a goalkeeper for I-League club Sreenidi Deccan.

Club career

ATK Mohun Bagan
Born in Gujarat, Lamba was part of the youth team at Indian Super League club ATK. Prior to the 2020–21 season, Lamba was announced as part of the ATK Mohun Bagan first-team.

Chennai City (loan)
On 15 January 2021, Lamba joined I-League club Chennai City on loan for the 2020–21 season. That day, Lamba made his professional debut, starting in a 2–0 defeat against Real Kashmir.

Career statistics

Club

References

External links
 Profile at the All India Football Federation
 Profile at the Indian Super League

2002 births
Living people
Indian footballers
Association football goalkeepers
ATK Mohun Bagan FC players
Chennai City FC players
I-League players
 Footballers from Gujarat
ATK (football club) players
I-League 2nd Division players
Indian Super League players
Kerala United FC players
Sreenidi Deccan FC players